Bluff Harbour is a harbour and lagoon in the South Island, New Zealand town of Bluff. The main port facilities are located close to the entrance of a large natural inlet (also known as Bluff Harbour) which includes a large, low-lying eastern arm, Awarua Bay, immediately to the east of the promontory which gives the town and harbour its name.

History
Bluff is one of New Zealand's earliest continuously occupied European settlements, and has been visited by whalers and sealers since at least 1823. A whaling station was established here in 1836. Bluff Wharf was constructed during the 1860s, and was linked to the nearby city of Invercargill by rail in 1867. As the city's main port, it was a major centre for the export of dairy and meat products in the late 19th and early 20th centuries. The construction of the Tiwai Point Aluminium Smelter in 1971 led to further upgrades in facilities.

A flying boat service operated from the harbour's Ocean Beach in the 1950s and 1960s, both for civilian services and for the RNZAF's patrols of subantarctic waters.

Port facilities
The port facilities are the southernmost in the South Island, and include the country's southernmost commercial deep water port. The port operates under the commercial name of South Port NZ from a  artificial island, Island Harbour, and includes a container terminal. Island Harbour was constructed over the course of the 1950s, and was officially opened in December 1960. A major cargo from the port is alumina from the Tiwai Point Aluminium Smelter, which sits on Tiwai Point, the low-lying eastern shore of the harbour's mouth, directly opposite Island Harbour.

The harbour is also used by Bluff's fishing fleet, mainly smaller vessels and to a large extent centred on Foveaux Strait oyster harvesting. The Bluff oyster is a major New Zealand delicacy. Bluff is also the northern terminus of the Stewart Island ferry, a daily service to and from Oban, which takes one hour to cross Foveaux Strait.

References

Bluff, New Zealand
Ports and harbours of New Zealand
Populated places in Southland, New Zealand
Landforms of Southland, New Zealand
Lagoons of New Zealand
Geography of Southland, New Zealand
Foveaux Strait